PK-82 Peshawar-XIV is a constituency for the Khyber Pakhtunkhwa Assembly of the Khyber Pakhtunkhwa province of Pakistan.

Members of Assembly

2018-2022 PK-79 Peshawar-XIV

Elections 2018 
Fazal Elahi of Pakistan Tehreek-e-Insaf won the seat by getting 18,065 votes.

Election 2023

See also 

 PK-81 Peshawar-XIII
 PK-83 Nowshera-I

References

External links 

 Khyber Pakhtunkhwa Assembly's official website
 Election Commission of Pakistan's official website
 Awaztoday.com Search Result
 Election Commission Pakistan Search Result

Khyber Pakhtunkhwa Assembly constituencies